The San Francisco Story is a 1952 American Western film directed by Robert Parrish and starring Joel McCrea and Yvonne De Carlo. The rough and tumble Barbary Coast of San Francisco is recreated with attention to detail, including Florence Bates as a saloon keeper Shanghaiing the unwary. Noir elements include many shadows, discordant musical score, snappy dialogue, a disabused hero who resists the good fight, and a femme fatale. A schematic but insightful rendering of political corruption, the film is essentially about standing up to bullies.

Plot summary

Law in San Francisco in 1856 is an ideal struggling to be established. Rick Nelson (Joel McCrea) is a loner with his own code of ethics, now a miner visiting his old stomping ground. He meets raven-haired beauty Adelaide McCall (Yvonne De Carlo), who's in the buggy of corrupt political power broker Andrew Cain (Sidney Blackmer). Newspaper editor Jim "Captain" Martin (Onslow Stevens) begs his old friend Rick to rejoin his peace-keeping Vigilantes to put an end to Cain's reign of thuggery. Rick knows how easy it is to buy a judge, so he settles matters his way.

Cast
 Joel McCrea as Rick Nelson
 Yvonne De Carlo as Adelaide McCall
 Sidney Blackmer as Andrew Cain
 Richard Erdman as Shorty
 Florence Bates as Sadie
 Onslow Stevens as Capt. Jim Martin
 John Raven as Lessing
 O.Z. Whitehead as Alfey
 Ralph Dumke as Winfield Holbert
 Robert Foulk as Thompson
 Lane Chandler as Morton

Production
The film was based on the novel Vigilante by Richard Summers, an English professor from the University of Arizona. The novel was set in 1856 concerned the career of David C. Broderick and his fictitious mistress Hester Barton, and their involvement in the second vigilante movement.

Film rights were bought by Joel McCrea and Jacques Tourneur in early 1949, before the novel had even been published. McCrea announced he only wanted to produce, not star, and that Tourneur would direct. They hoped to set up the film at MGM and cast Ava Gardner. The novel was published in July 1949. The New York Times called it an "excellent short novel... a well-written, lusty yarn".

In March 1951 it was announced the film would be made by Fidelity Pictures starring McCrea and an "unknown" actress. Fidelity was a new company established in 1949 by producer Howard Welsch.

In July 1951 Fidelity announced the film would be one of six movies Fidelity would make for release through Warner Bros. Yvonne de Carlo signed to co-star.

Jerome Chodorov was reported as working on the script in August. He is not credited on the final film.

Yvonne De Carlo signed to appear opposite McCrea in September 1951. She signed a two-picture deal with Fidelity and returned early from a tour she was making to Tel Aviv.

Fidelity announced the six films they would make for Warners would be budgeted between $600,000 and $700,000 and include The San Francisco Story, My Fine Feathered Friend with Dennis Morgan, Gardenia based on a story by Vera Caspary, Lela Cade, The Gentleman from Chicago by Horace McCoy, Reluctant Bride by Frederick Stephani and The Scarlet Flame, a story about Brazil's battle for independence by Emilio Tovar, to star De Carlo. Most of these films were not made.

Filming took place in late 1951. During filming, Will Jacoby, husband of cast member Florence Bates died. Bates was offered time off but she elected to continue to work.

References

External links
 
 
 
 

1952 films
1950s historical films
American historical films
1952 Western (genre) films
American black-and-white films
American Western (genre) films
Films based on American novels
Warner Bros. films
Films directed by Robert Parrish
Films set in San Francisco
Films set in the 1850s
Films scored by Emil Newman
Films scored by Paul Dunlap
1950s English-language films
1950s American films